Kaia Iva (born 28 April 1964) is a Pro Patria and Res Publica Union politician. She has been Minister of Social Protection of Estonia since 23 November 2016. She served as the Mayor of Türi from 2002 until 2005. She served as member of Riigikogu from 2007 to 2015.

References 

1964 births
Living people
Members of the Riigikogu, 2007–2011
Members of the Riigikogu, 2011–2015
Pro Patria Union politicians
21st-century Estonian politicians
21st-century Estonian women politicians
People from Türi
Women mayors of places in Estonia
Women government ministers of Estonia
Women members of the Riigikogu
Tallinn University alumni